Volha Krautsova (born 25 June 1981) is a Belarusian long-distance runner who specializes in the 5000 metres.

Achievements

Personal bests
1500 metres - 4:05.76 min (2005)
3000 metres - 9:02.9 min (2007)
5000 metres - 14:47.75 min (2005)
10,000 metres - 31:58.52 min (2007)

External links

1981 births
Living people
Belarusian female long-distance runners
Athletes (track and field) at the 2004 Summer Olympics
Athletes (track and field) at the 2008 Summer Olympics
Olympic athletes of Belarus